Maligram is a village in the Pingla CD block in the Kharagpur subdivision of the Paschim Medinipur district in the state of West Bengal, India.

Geography

Location

Area overview
Kharagpur subdivision, shown partly in the map alongside, mostly has alluvial soils, except in two CD blocks in the west – Kharagpur I and Keshiary, which mostly have lateritic soils. Around 74% of the total cultivated area is cropped more than once. With a density of population of 787 per km2nearly half of the district’s population resides in this subdivision. 14.33% of the population lives in urban areas and 86.67% lives in the rural areas.

Note: The map alongside presents some of the notable locations in the subdivision. All places marked in the map are linked in the larger full screen map.

Demographics
As per 2011 Census of India Maligram had a total population of 11,337 of which 5,747 (51%) were males and 5,590 (49%) were females. Population below 6 years was 1,679. The total number of literates in Maligram was 8,019 (70.73% of the population over 6 years).

Transport
Maligram is on the Dakbaungalow-Moyna Road off Debra-Tabagaria Road.

Education
Pingla Thana Mahavidyalaya, established in 1965, is affiliated to Vidyasagar University. It offers honours courses in Bengali, English, Sanskrit, history, political science, philosophy, education, geography, chemistry, mathematics, physics and botany. It also offers general courses in BA, BSc and BCom.

References
	

Villages in Paschim Medinipur district